Haplochromis lividus is a species of cichlid endemic to Lake Victoria.  This species can reach a length of  SL.

References

lividus
Fish described in 1956
Fish of Lake Victoria
Taxonomy articles created by Polbot